Wham! Bang! Pow! Let's Rock Out! is the fifth album by Art Brut released on 23 November 2018.  The album is the band's first album in seven years after the 2012 release Brilliant! Tragic!. The lead-off single from the album was the eponymously-titled "Wham! Bang! Pow! Let's Rock Out!", the first new Art Brut material to be released since 2011.  A second single, with video, "Hospital!" was released on 2 October 2018, along with full details of the album.

Cover
The album cover is by pop artist Jim Avignon, and its design references the cover to Days of Future Passed by the Moody Blues.

Reception

Track listing

Personnel
Eddie Argos - vocals
Ian Catskilkin - guitar
Toby MacFarlaine - guitar
Freddy Feedback - bass guitar
Charlie Layton - drums

References

2018 albums
Art Brut albums
Alcopop! Records albums